Vanhorniidae is a family parasitic wasps belonging to the Proctotrupoidea. There are only two extant genera, Heloriserphus and Vanhornia, which are native to the Northern Hemisphere. They are parasitoids of beetle larvae belonging to the family Eucnemidae.

References

Proctotrupoidea
Apocrita families